Zhang Hongbo (born 6 June 1980 in Panzhihua, Sichuan, China) is a Chinese baseball player who is a member of Team China at the 2008 Summer Olympics.

Sports career
1989 Sichuan Panzhihua Sports School (Baseball);
1997 Guangdong Provincial Team;
1998 National Youth Team;
1999 National Team

Major performances
1997/2001 National Games - 3rd/2nd;
2006/2007 National League - 2nd;
2006 Asian Games - 4th

References
Profile 2008 Olympics Team China

1980 births
2006 World Baseball Classic players
Baseball players at the 2006 Asian Games
Baseball players at the 2008 Summer Olympics
Baseball players at the 2010 Asian Games
Baseball players from Sichuan
Living people
Olympic baseball players of China
Chinese baseball players
People from Panzhihua
Asian Games competitors for China